Bikash Chowdhury (7 January 1938 – 23 November 2019) was an Indian cricketer. He played in five first-class matches for Bengal between 1959 and 1963.

See also
 List of Bengal cricketers

References

External links
 

1938 births
2019 deaths
Indian cricketers
Bengal cricketers
People from Howrah